Torricelli's law, also known as Torricelli's theorem, is a theorem in fluid dynamics relating the speed of fluid flowing from an orifice to the height of fluid above the opening. The law states that the speed v of efflux of a fluid through a sharp-edged hole at the bottom of the tank filled to a depth h is the same as the speed that a body (in this case a drop of water) would acquire in falling freely from a height h, i.e. , where g is the acceleration due to gravity. This expression comes from equating the kinetic energy gained, with the potential energy lost, mgh, and solving for v. The law was discovered (though not in this form) by the Italian scientist Evangelista Torricelli, in 1643. It was later shown to be a particular case of Bernoulli's principle.

Derivation

Under the assumptions of an incompressible fluid with negligible viscosity, Bernoulli's principle states that the hydraulic energy is constant 

at any two points in the flowing liquid.

In order to derive Torricelli's formula the first point with no index is taken at the liquid's surface, and the second just outside the opening. Furthermore 
 is equal to the height  of the liquid's surface over the opening:  

Torricelli's law is obtained as a special case when the opening  is very small relative to the horizontal cross-section of the container :

Torricelli's law can only be applied when viscous effects can be neglected which is the case for water flowing out through orifices in vessels.

Experimental verification: Spouting can experiment

Every physical theory must be verified by experiments. The spouting can experiment consists of a cylindrical vessel filled up with water and with several holes in different heights. It is designed to show that in a liquid with an open surface, pressure increases with depth. The lower a jet is on the tube, the more powerful it is. The fluid exit velocity is greater further down the tube.

The outflowing jet forms a downward parabola where every parabola reaches farther out the larger the distance between the orifice and the surface is. The shape of the parabola  is only dependent on the outflow velocity and can be determined from the fact that every molecule of the liquid forms a ballistic trajectory (see projectile motion) where the initial velocity is the outflow velocity :

The results confirm the correctness of Torricelli’s law very well.

Discharge and time to empty a cylindrical vessel
Assuming that a vessel is cylindrical with fixed cross-sectional area , with orifice of area  at the bottom, then rate of change of water level height  is not constant. The water volume in the vessel is changing due to the discharge  out of the vessel:

Integrating both sides and re-arranging, we obtain

This formula has several implications. If a tank with volume  with cross section  and height , so that , is fully filled, then the time to drain all the water is

This implies that high tanks with same filling volume drains faster than wider ones.

Lastly, we can re-arrange the above equation to determine the height of the water level  as a function of time  as

where  is the height of the container while  is the discharge time as given above.

Discharge experiment, coefficient of discharge

The dicharge theory can be tested by measuring the emptying time  or time series of the water level  within the cylindrical vessel. In a lot of cases such experiments do not confirm the presented dicharge theory: When comparing the theoretical predictions of the discharge process with measurements, very large differences can be found in such cases. In reality, the tank usually drains much more slowly. Looking at the discharge formula 

two quantities could be responsible for this discrepancy: the outflow velocity or the effective outflow cross section. 

In 1738 Daniel Bernoulli attributed the discrepancy between the theoretical and the observed outflow behavior to the formation of a vena contracta which reduces the outflow cross-section from the orifice's cross-section  to the contracted cross-section  and stated that the discharge is:

Actually this is confirmed by state-of-the-art experiments (see ) in which the discharge, the outflow velocity and the cross-section of the vena contracta were measured. Here it was also shown that the outflow velocity is predicted extremeliy well by Torricelli's law and that no velocity correction (like a "coefficient of velocity") is needed. 

The problem remains how to determine the cross-section of the vena contrata. This is normally be done by introducing a discharge coefficient which relates the discharge to the orifice's cross-section and Torricelli's law:

For low viscosity liquids (such as water) flowing out of a round hole in a tank, the discharge coefficient is in the order of 0.65. By discharging through a round tube or hose, the coefficient of discharge can be increased to over 0.9. For rectangular openings, the discharge coefficient can be up to 0.67, depending on the height-width ratio.

Applications

Horizontal distance covered by the jet of liquid

Since  be the vertical height traveled by a particle of jet stream, we have from the laws of falling body

where  is the time taken by the jet particle to fall from the orifice to the ground.

Thus, we have from the two equations

Here we have

Solving  we obtain

and the maximum range

Clepsydra problem

A clepsydra is a clock that measures time by the flow of water. It consists of a pot with a small hole at the bottom through which the water can escape. The amount of escaping water gives the measure of time. As given by the Torricelli's law, the rate of efflux through the hole depends on the height of the water; and as the water level diminishes, the discharge is not uniform. A simple solution is to keep the height of the water constant. This can be attained by letting a constant stream of water flow into the vessel, the overflow of which is allowed to escape from the top, from another hole. Thus having a constant height, the discharging water from the bottom can be collected in another cylindrical vessel with uniform graduation to measure time. This is an inflow clepsydra.

Alternatively, by carefully selecting the shape of the vessel, the water level in the vessel can be made to decrease at constant rate. By measuring the level of water remaining in the vessel, the time can be measured with uniform graduation. This is an example of outflow clepsydra. Since the water outflow rate is higher when the water level is higher (due to more pressure), the fluid's volume should be more than a simple cylinder when the water level is high. That is, the radius should be larger when the water level is higher. We want to find the radius such that the water level has a constant rate of decrease, i.e. .

The instantaneous rate of change in water volume is

From Torricelli's law, the rate of outflow is 

From these two equations, 

Thus, the radius of the container should change in proportion to the quartic root of its height, 

Likewise, if the shape of the vessel of the outflow clepsydra cannot be modified according to the above specification, then we need to use non-uniform graduation to measure time. The emptying time formula above tells us the time should be calibrated as the square root of the discharged water height,  More precisely,

Torricelli's original derivation

Evangelista Torricelli's original derivation can be found in the second book 'De motu aquarum' of his 'Opera Geometrica' (see ): He starts a tube AB (Figure (a)) filled up with water to the level A. Then a narrow opening is drilled at the level of B and connected to a second vertical tube BC. Due to the hydrostatic principle of communicating vessels the water lifts up to the same filling level AC in both tubes (Figure (b)). When finally the tube BC is removed (Figure (c)) the water should again lift up to this height, which is named AD in Figure (c). The reason for that behavior is the fact that a droplet's falling velocity from a height A to B is equal to the initial velocity that is needed to lift up a droplet from B to A.

When performing such an experiment only the height C (instead of D in figure (c)) will be reached which contradicts the proposed theory. Torricelli attributes this defect to the air resistance and to the fact that the descending drops collide with ascending drops.

Torricelli's argumentation is, as a matter of fact, wrong because the pressure in free jet is the surrounding atmospheric pressure, while the pressure in a communicating vessel is the hydrostatic pressure. At that time the concept of pressure was unknown.

See also

Darcy's law
Dynamic pressure
Fluid statics
Hagen–Poiseuille equation
Helmholtz's theorems
Kirchhoff equations
Knudsen equation
Manning equation
Mild-slope equation
Morison equation
Navier–Stokes equations
Oseen flow
Pascal's law
Poiseuille's law
Potential flow
Pressure
Static pressure
Pressure head
Relativistic Euler equations
Reynolds decomposition
Stokes flow
Stokes stream function
Stream function
Streamlines, streaklines and pathlines

References

Further reading
 
 Stanley Middleman, An Introduction to Fluid Dynamics: Principles of Analysis and Design (John Wiley & Sons, 1997)  
 

Fluid dynamics
Physics experiments